The 2008 MuchMusic Video Awards were held in Toronto, Ontario at MuchMusic's  headquarters on June 15, 2008 with the rain-soaked Red carpet arrivals that started at 8:00pm ET, but was slightly delayed by rainstorms that soaked the crowds and artists, the awards  started at 9:00 and ended at 11:00. The show featured performances by illScarlett, Flo Rida, Girlicious, Sean Kingston, JabbaWockeeZ, Simple Plan, the first performance by New Kids on the Block in 15 years and others. The most nominated artist was Hedley with six nominations in which they won four awards. This was the first MMVA to have an afterparty, which was broadcast exclusively on MuchMusic.com, and featured Bedouin Soundclash.

Awards
The nominees were, with the winners in bold:

Best Video
Hedley — "For the Nights I Can't Remember"
 Belly feat. Mario Winans — "Ridin'"
 Feist — "1234"
 illScarlett — "Nothing Special"
 Simple Plan — "When I'm Gone"

Best Director
  Hedley — "For The Nights I Can't Remember" (directed by: Kevin De Freitas)
 Bedouin Soundclash — "Walls Fall Down" (directed by: Marc Ricciardelli)
 Belly feat. Mario Winans — "Ridin'" (directed by: RT!)
 illScarlett — "Nothing Special" (directed by: Chris Sargent & Steve Mottershead)
 Sam Roberts — "Them Kids" (directed by: Dave Pawsey)

Best Post-Production
  Sam Roberts — "Them Kids" (post-production: Duplex)
 Buck 65 — "Dang" (post-production: Christopher Mills)
 Classified ft. Maestro & DJ IV — "Hard To Be Hip-Hop" (post-production: Aden Bahadori & harv)
 illScarlett — "Nothing Special" (post-production: Steve Mottershead)
 The Saint Alvia Cartel — "Blonde Kryptonite" (post-production: Nick Flook, Mike Sevigny & Jeff Middleton)

Best Cinematography
Hedley — "For the Nights I Can't Remember" (Samy Inayeh)
 Belly feat. Mario Winans — "Ridin'" (Brendan Steacy)
 City and Colour — "Waiting" (Simon Shohet)
 Hedley — "She's So Sorry" (Samy Inayeh)
 Skye Sweetnam — "Human" (Brendan Steacy)

MuchLOUD Best Rock Video
Hedley — "She's So Sorry"
 illScarlett — "Nothing Special"
 Simple Plan — "When I'm Gone"
 Sum 41 — "With Me"
 The Trews — "Hold Me In Your Arms"

MuchVIBE Best Rap Video
 Belly ft. Mario Winans — "Ridin'"
 Classified ft. Maestro & DJ IV — "Hard To Be Hip-Hop"
 JB ft. The Game — Fire In Ya Eyes
 JDiggz ft. Voyce — Just Wanna Party
 Tru-Paz — Hotel Hell

VideoFACT Best Independent Video
Wintersleep — "Weighty Ghost"
 Bedouin Soundclash — "Walls Fall Down"
 Cancer Bats — "Hail Destroyer"
 Neverending White Lights — "Always"
 The Russian Futurists — "Paul Simon"

MuchMusic.com Most Watched Video
 Rihanna — "Umbrella"
 Avril Lavigne — "Girlfriend"
 Fergie — "Big Girls Don't Cry"
 Timbaland f. Keri Hilson & D.O.E. — "The Way I Are"
 Hilary Duff — "Stranger"

Best International Video - Artist
 Rihanna — "Don't Stop the Music"
 Alicia Keys — "No One"
 Chris Brown ft. T-Pain — "Kiss Kiss"
 Fergie — "Clumsy"
 Flo Rida ft. T-Pain — "Low"
 Kanye West — "Stronger"
 Madonna ft. Justin Timberlake and Timbaland — "4 Minutes"
 Miley Cyrus — "Start All Over"
 Sean Kingston — "Beautiful Girls"
 Usher ft. Young Jeezy — "Love In This Club"

Best International Video - Group
Linkin Park — "Bleed It Out"
 Fall Out Boy — "The Take Over, The Break's Over"
 Foo Fighters — "The Pretender"
 MGMT — "Time to Pretend"
 Maroon 5 — "Wake Up Call"
 OneRepublic — "Stop and Stare"
 Panic! at the Disco — "Nine In The Afternoon"
 Queens Of The Stone Age — "Sick, Sick, Sick"
 Timbaland presents OneRepublic — "Apologize"
 Tokio Hotel — "Ready, Set, Go!"

UR Fave: International Video
 Fall Out Boy — "The Take Over, The Break's Over"
 Flo Rida ft. T-Pain — "Low"
 Kanye West— "Stronger"
 Rihanna — "Don't Stop the Music"
 OneRepublic ft. Timbaland — "Apologize"

UR Fave: Group
 Simple Plan — "When I'm Gone"
 Hedley — "For The Nights I Can't Remember"
 Billy Talent — "Surrender"
 Finger Eleven — "Falling On"
 illScarlett — "Nothing Special"

UR Fave: Artist
 Avril Lavigne — "When You're Gone"
 Belly ft. Mario Winans — "Ridin'"
 Feist — "1234"
 City and Colour — "Waiting"
 Nelly Furtado — "Do It

Contests

MMVA10k
MuchMusic held the MMVA10k Contest during the Video Awards. Three weeks prior to the event 2008 MMVA predictions and trivia were posted daily and viewers were able to play along during the live event on June 15, 2008. For every 500 points, viewers received a ballot to win $10,000. Viewers were also able to answer polls and chat with other MMVA viewers.

Performances
The following acts performed a song live during the show:
 "Low" — Flo Rida and "When I'm Gone" - Simple Plan medley
 "Nothing Special" — illScarlett
 "Take You There" — Sean Kingston
 "Dangerous" — Kardinal Offishall featuring Akon
  JabbaWockeeZ - "Stronger" by Kanye West
 "Never Too Late" — Hedley
 "Like Me" — Girlicious
 "Take a Bow" — Rihanna
 "Summertime" — New Kids on the Block

Guests

 Chace Crawford
 Brody Jenner
 Whitney Port
 Kristin Cavallari
 Kal Penn
 Jesse McCartney
 Melanie C
 Mike Myers
 Perez Hilton
 Sum 41
 Sam Roberts
 Theory of a Deadman
 The Trews
 Belly
 Finger Eleven
 Bedouin Soundclash
 City and Colour
 Rainn Wilson
 Jason Spezza

MMVA08: Aftermath
The 2008 MuchMusic Video Awards are the only MMVA to feature an afterparty.  The afterparty featured Bedouin Soundclash performing in front of a small crowd with several other artists.  They performed a total of ten songs.  The afterparty aired only once for a scheduled 30 minutes after the MMVA on muchmusic.com and MuchMoreMusic, but extended for a few minutes on muchmusic.com.

Performances
The performances were:
 St. Andrews — Bedouin Soundclash
 I Wanna Be Sedated — Bedouin Soundclash
 Can't Hurry Love — Bedouin Soundclash with Zaki Ibrahim
 Should I Stay Or Should I Go — Bedouin Soundclash with Saint Alvia
 Come Dancing — Bedouin Soundclash with Sam Roberts & K-OS
 Mirror In The Bathroom — Bedouin Soundclash with Wade MacNeil of Alexisonfire
 Pressure Drop — Bedouin Soundclash with all guests
 Dancing In The Dark — Bedouin Soundclash with Arkells & Saint Alvia
 Yesterday — K-OS
 Don't Let Me Down — Bedouin Soundclash with all guests

References

External links
 

MuchMusic Video Awards
Muchmusic Video Awards
Muchmusic Video Awards
Muchmusic Video Awards
Muchmusic Video Awards